Brodtville is an unincorporated community located in the town of Wyalusing, Grant County, Wisconsin, United States. The community was named for Joakim Brodt, the first postmaster when the post office was established in May 1864.

Notes

Unincorporated communities in Grant County, Wisconsin
Unincorporated communities in Wisconsin